In the Eye of the Wind in Persian Dar Chashm-e Bād (Persian: در چشم باد) is an Iranian historical television series directed by Masoud Jafari Jozani.

Plot
It narrates the Iranian history in a 60-year period from Jungle movement to Iranian revolution and Iran–Iraq War. In the Eye of the Storm spans the period of history between the revolutionary movement begun by Iran's national hero Mirza Kuchik Khan in the early twentieth century, to the freedom of Khoramshahr during the eight-year war between Iran and Iraq in the 1980s. The story is told through the trials and tribulations, love and relationships, of one family.

Production 
The television series "In the Eyes of the Wind" produced by Reza Ansarian and started with the production of "Mahmoud Khosravi" and "Sayyed Jalal Niabi" was replaced by "Habibollah Kase Saz" a few months later. After five years of production, it was given to Massoud Jafari Juzani and Abbas Akbari.

The whole work takes about 5 minutes, about half of which was filmed at the time of Ansari's production and bowl making, and the other 2% was filmed at Jovani and Akbari. Alireza Zarrin Dast started filming the series, but he left the band late last year, and Hassan Pooya replaced him as film director for a month, after which he was transferred to Amir Karimi where he worked till the end. Reconstruction of the streets of Taleghani, Lalezar, and Pamenar was reconstructed to capture the sequences of years 1 and 2, and the reconstruction of the Khorramshahr Mosque took about six months to complete in the main mosque itself.  was the main location of Phase Two of the series.

The third phase of the series related to the Iran-Iraq War was filmed in the Sacred Defense Cinema around Tehran and in Khorramshahr city in year 1–5. In this phase, the designer was Saeed Malekan, Costume Designer: Majid Mirfarkharai, Assistant Director: Ahmad Ramazanzadeh and Director of War Production: Seyed Ali Ghaemmaghami.

The director of the project planning and planning team and the first assistant director is Reza Jafari Jozani.

Music
Hossein Alizadeh has made the music for the series.

Cast
Parsa Pirouzfar as Bijan
Setareh Safarave as Leily
Akbar Abdi as "Hassan Agha"
Kambiz Dirbaz as Nader
Angel Rhoades as Holly
Aysa Aghchay as Aysa
Brad Potts as Dexter
Michael Beardsley as Ray Smith
Abigail McConnell as Nurse
Jahangir Almasi as "Colonel"
Laleh Eskandari as Fakhrosadat
Mohammad-Reza Hedayati as Mahmoud Dezhgir
Sam Derakhshani
Saeed Nikpour as Mirza Hassan Irani
Saeed Rad as Reza Shah
Mahmoud Pakniyat
Sahar Jafari Jozani

References

External links
 
TV series Gallery at IRIB website

Iranian drama television series
Historical television series
2000s Iranian television series
2008 Iranian television series debuts
2010s Iranian television series
Masoud Jafari Jozani
Islamic Republic of Iran Broadcasting original programming